Lorne Cardinal (born 6 January 1964)  is a Canadian stage, television and film actor, best known for portraying Davis Quinton on Corner Gas.  He is a former rugby union player.

Early life
Cardinal was born on a reserve of the Sucker Creek First Nation at Lesser Slave Lake. He attended local schools as a child. He obtained a B.F.A. degree in acting from the University of Alberta in 1993, and was also the first Indigenous student to do so.

Cardinal is also a rugby union enthusiast. He played for the Edmonton Druids RFC and then the Strathcona Druids, and was the first Indigenous person to play for the latter team. In his role in Corner Gas, he is shown wearing Saskatchewan Prairie Fire rugby team merchandise.

Career
Cardinal has had a variety of roles in theatre, film and television. These include Insomnia, renegadepress.com, Crazy Horse and Wolf Canyon.

Of Cree descent, he is noted for playing First Nations roles in many productions, including Tecumseh in Canada: A People's History, an aboriginal elder in Tkaronto, and  Davis Quinton, a Cree man, on Corner Gas. He also appeared on many episodes of North of 60. Cardinal can be heard as the voice of Jacob Morin on the APTN stop motion animated series Wapos Bay: The Series.

In 2011, Cardinal starred alongside Craig Lauzon in a production of Kenneth T. Williams' play Thunderstick. The two actors traded roles on alternate days.

Cardinal completed a documentary film titled Chasing Lear (2016) with producer Monique Hurteau; it premiered on APTN. Chasing Lear explores the National Arts Centre theatre production of King Lear, that had an all-Aboriginal cast. Actors included August Schellenberg as Lear, Billy Merasty, Jani Lauzon, Tantoo Cardinal, and Kevin Loring. Lorne Cardinal did double-duty, serving as assistant director and also carrying the role of Duke of Albany.

He recently starred in the award-winning satirical short film 'No Reservations'. The film looks at pipeline politics and was created as a part of the Crazy8's film competition. As of 2020 Cardinal has a recurring role in the network TV drama FBI: Most Wanted.

Personal life
Cardinal lives on the coast of British Columbia in Squamish with his wife Monique Hurteau, a producer, writer, and comedian. His brother Lewis, a business consultant and human rights activist in Edmonton, was a New Democratic Party candidate in the 2011 federal election.

Cardinal has eight other siblings who live in several areas of Canada.

Filmography

Film

Television

Awards and nominations

See also
 Indigenous Canadian personalities

References

External links
 Official website
 
 Lorne Cardinal Facebook Page

Living people
Canadian male film actors
Canadian male television actors
Canadian male voice actors
Cree people
First Nations male actors
People from Big Lakes County
Male actors from Alberta
Canadian male stage actors
1964 births